Ignacy Sachs (Warsaw, 1927) is a Polish-born French economist. He is considered to be an ecosocioeconomist for his ideas about development as a combination of economic growth, equalitarian increase in social well-being and environmental preservation. The term ecosocioeconomy was created by Karl William Kapp, a German economist and one of the authors who inspired the so-called political economy during the 1970s.

Professor Sachs taught at Paris XII University. Now Sachs is an invited researcher in the Institut of Advanced Studies in University of São Paulo - he lived in Brazil between 1941 and 1953 as a war refugee. He was one of the rare Jews who have returned to Poland (before his move to France) after the World War II; he did it due to his communist convictions.

Biography

Works published in Brazil and about Brazil
Capitalismo de Estado e Subdesenvolvimento: Padrões de setor público em economias subdesenvolvidas. Petrópolis : Vozes. 1969.
Ecodesenvolvimento : crescer sem destruir. Trans. E. Araujo. - São Paulo: Vértice, 1981.
Espaços, tempos e estratégias do desenvolvimento. São Paulo: Vértice. 1986.
Histoire. culture et styles de développement : Brésil et Inde -esquisse de comparaison under the assessment of C. Comeliau and I. Sachs. L'Harmattan, UNESCO/CENTRAL, Paris.
Extractivismo na Amazônia brasileira: perspectivas sobre o desenvolvimento regional. Ed. M. Cllisener-Godt and Ignacy Sachs. -Paris: UNESCO, 1994; -96 pp. (Compêndio MAB ; 18)
Estratégias de transição para o século XXI: desenvolvimento e meio ambiente. Prologue: M. F. Strong ; trans. Magda Lopes. São Paulo: Studio Nobel : Fundação do desenvolvimento administrativo (FUNDAP), 1993.
Brazilian Perspectives on Sustainable Development of the Amazon Region. Ed. M. Clüsener-Godt and I. Sachs. UNESCO/The Parthenon Publishing Group, Paris-New York, 1995.
Rumo à Ecossocioeconomia - teoria e prática do desenvolvimento. São Paulo: Cortez Editora, 2007.

Works about Ignacy Sachs
Desenvolvimento e Meio Ambiente no Brasil - A contribuição de Ignacy Sachs. Organizacão de Paulo Freire Vieira. Mauricio Andres Ribeiro. Roberto Messias Franco, Renato Caporali Cordeiro. Editora Palotti/APED. Florianópolis. 1998.
Pour aborder le XXIème siècle avec le développement durable, textes édités par Solange Passaris et Krystyna Vinaver. Economies et Sociétés - Cahiers de l'ISMEA, tome xxxn. n° 1/1998. Serie "Développement, croissance et progrès", Presses Universitaires de Grenoble, Grenoble.

Autobiography
La troisième rive. Editions Bourin : Paris. 2008. Published in Brazil as A Terceira Margem by Companhia Das Letras in 2009.
This book is an autobiography of Ignacy Sachs and Viola Sachs. Its title is inspired on a short story written by Guimarães Rosa.

See also
Viola Sachs

References

External links
  Institut d'urbanisme de paris, Paris 12 Val de Marne University: Pr Sachs' Interview
Ignacy Sachs talks about the alternatives facing the third oil crisis
Article by I. Sachs - "Brasil rural: da redescoberta à invenção"
Interview with Ignacy Sachs, recorded in video
Artigo: "Ecossocioeconomia? O que é isso, coleguinha?"
Interview with Ignacy Sachs
Articles and interviews
United Nations Intellectual History Project
A book written by Ignacy Sachs and published by Vedams Books, an Indian publisher

1927 births
Sustainability advocates
French economists
20th-century Polish Jews
Polish emigrants to France
Living people